Ben-Zion, also spelled Ben Zion, and Benzion ("Son of Zion") is a Hebrew given name. It may refer to the following people:

Given name
 Ben Zion Abba Shaul (1924–1998), rosh yeshiva, Porat Yosef Yeshiva
 Ben-Zion Ben-Yehuda, birth name of Itamar Ben-Avi (1882–1943), first native speaker of Modern Hebrew as the son of Eliezer Ben-Yehuda; journalist and Zionist activist
 Ben-Zion Bokser (1907–1984), major Conservative rabbi of the United States
 Ben-Zion Dinur (1884–1973), Israeli politician
 Benzion Freshwater (born 1948), British billionaire property investor
 Ben-Zion Gold (1923–2016), American rabbi
 Ben-Zion Gopstein (born 1969), Israeli radical right-wing activist
 Ben Zion Aryeh Leibish Halberstam (born 1955), fifth Bobover Rebbe
 Ben Zion Halberstam (1874–1941), second Bobover Rebbe
 Ben-Zion Halfon (1930–1977), Israeli politician
 Benzion Halper (1884–1924), Lithuanian-American Hebraist and Arabist
 Ben-Zion Harel (1892–1972), Israeli doctor and politician
 Ben Zion Hyman (1891–1984), Canadian Jewish bookseller
 Ben-Zion Keshet (1914–1984), Israeli politician 
 Benzion Klatzko (born 1968), American rabbi, university professor, founder of the largest Jewish social network
 Ben-Zion Leitner (–2012), Israeli soldier, received highest military decoration during the 1948 Arab–Israeli War
 Benzion Miller (born 1947), Jewish cantor of world renown
 Benzion Netanyahu (1910–2012), Israeli historian, father of Israeli Prime Minister Benjamin Netanyahu
 Ben-Zion Rubin (born 1939), Israeli politician
 Ben Zion Solomon, American-born Israeli musician
 Ben-Zion Sternberg (1894–1962), Zionist leader
 Ben-Zion Meir Hai Uziel (1880–1953), Sephardic Chief Rabbi of Mandatory Palestine and of Israel
 Ben-Zion Witler (1907–1961), Jewish singer, actor, coupletist, comedian and composer

Surname
 Aaron Ben-Zion ibn Alamani, 12th century Egyptian judge
 Yehoshua Ben-Zion (1924–2004), Israeli banker

Pseudonym
 Ben-Zion (artist) (1897–1987), also known as Ben-Zion Weinman, Ukrainian-American painter, sculptor, poet and a dramatist. Member of "The Ten" group of expressionist artists.
 S. Ben Zion (1870–1932), pen name of Simha Alter Guttman, Hebrew writer, educator, newspaper editor (Ha-Omer, Haaretz literary supplement), publisher, co-founder of Tel Aviv, father of artist Nachum Gutman; Bessarabia - Odessa - Jaffa & Tel Aviv, Palestine.

See also 
 Ben (Hebrew)
 Zion (disambiguation)

References

Hebrew masculine given names